The North American Native Plant Society (NANPS) is a volunteer-operated registered charitable organization concerned with conserving native plants in wild areas and restoring indigenous flora to developed areas. It is noted for its work in educating business and the public about the benefits of using native plants, and its work in promoting native species through plant sales and seed exchanges has been credited with the resurgence of some species. It also maintains a list of local native plant societies across the United States and Canada.

Current activities
NANPS is dedicated to the Study, Conservation, Cultivation & Restoration of North America's Native Flora.
NANPS's key purpose is to provide information and to inspire an appreciation of native plants with an aim to restoring healthy ecosystems across the continent. To that end, NANPS currently:
 publishes a 16-page quarterly newsletter, The Blazing Star (ISSN 2291-8280), and an e-newsletter, The Local Scoop
 provides a forum for people interested in learning more about native plants
 creates information sheets, booklets and brochures on a variety of related topics
 manages two conservation properties in Ontario and works to restore ecosystems
 provides a native seed exchange available to NANPS members
 staffs information booths at a variety of public events
 offers guided excursions to natural areas
 operates Canada's largest native plant sale each May followed by a number of smaller sales from June to October
 maintains a searchable Native Plant Database, and a list of commercial growers who meet its ethical guidelines 
 provides support to people adding native plants in urban/suburban areas 
 creates and presents information to municipalities and interested groups on the benefits of native plants
 hosts a variety of seminars and workshops, culminating in an Annual General Meeting, plant sale, and awards presentation each October

Logo
The logo was designed in 1994 by Beth McEachen. It is a woodcut portraying three native plants representing three transcontinental, native families, viz: Araceae, Orchidaceae, Iridaceae. The examples shown are an arum, a cypripedium and a blue-eyed grass.

History

NANPS was founded in 1985 by a small group of conservationists as the Canadian Wildflower Society. (The name was later changed to the North American Native Plant Society to reflect a wider range of activities and broader membership.) In 1985, the Society began publishing their well-received native plant magazine, Wildflower, under the editorship of James L. Hodgins.

In 1985 it also established a gardening Code of Ethics for its members. In 1986, it sponsored its first public annual native plant sale and filed a letters patent. In 1988, it sponsored its first native plant propagation workshop, and established wildflower gardens tour in Guelph and Waterloo, Ontario, Canada.

By 1993, it purchased a 50-acre Carolinian woodlot known as Shining Tree Woods near Cultus, Ontario, to conserve the nationally rare native cucumber tree, Magnolia acuminata. In 1994, the Canadian Wildflowe Society co-published (with the Federation of Ontario Naturalists) the first booklet on the native plants of Carolinian Canada with conservation and horticultural advice.

The Canadian Wildflower Society changed its name to the North American Native Plant Society (NANPS) in 1998. In 2003, it purchased a five-hectare (13-acre) parcel of Zinkan Island Cove, a provincially designated ANSI (Area of Natural and Scientific Interest) on the Bruce Peninsula in Ontario. In 2000 the North American Native Plant Society decided to stop supporting the publication of  Wildflower magazine, and replaced it with "The Blazing Star'''.  Wildflower was published independently, but eventually ceased publication in 2004. In 2005, NANPS began conducting regular seminars around Ontario, and formed partnerships with  Toronto Botanical Garden and the City of Markham  Also, a NANPS member founded an e-newsletter, The Local Scoop.

In 2010, NANPS celebrated its 25th anniversary by publishing a special edition of The Blazing Star. NANPS founder and Honorary President, James A French, published Silver Memories'', a personal recollection of the first 25 years.

In 2013 the Society  campaigned for a native plant garden as part of the renewal of Ontario Place.

References

External links 
 Official North American Native Plant Society (NANPS) website
 Official  NANPS Facebook
 Official  NANPS Twitter
 NANPS e-newsletter: The Local Scoop website

Native plant societies
 
Environmental organizations based in Ontario
International environmental organizations
Non-profit organizations based in Toronto
Environmental organizations established in 1985
1985 establishments in Ontario